Zar Zar Myint (born 5 June 1993) is a Burmese footballer who plays as a goalkeeper. She has been a member of the Myanmar women's national team.

International career
Zar Zar Myint represented Myanmar at the 2009 AFC U-16 Women's Championship and the 2011 AFC U-19 Women's Championship. She capped at senior level during the 2020 AFC Women's Olympic Qualifying Tournament (first round).

References

1993 births
Living people
Women's association football goalkeepers
Burmese women's footballers
People from Kengtung
Myanmar women's international footballers